Baldus is both a surname and a given name. Notable people with the name include:

Baldus de Ubaldis, Italian jurist
Alvin Baldus (1926–2017), American politician
Edouard Baldus, French photographer
Marc Baldus, physicist
Wolfgang Baldus, German philatelist and writer